Rotrude (or sometimes referred to as Hruodrud/Hruodhaid) (c.775 – 6 June 810) was a Frankish princess, the second daughter of Charlemagne from his marriage to Hildegard.

Early life

Few clear records remain of Rotrude's early life. She was educated in the Palace School by Alcuin, who affectionately calls her Columba in his letters to her. When she was six, her father betrothed her to the Byzantine emperor Constantine VI, whose mother Irene was ruling as regent. The Greeks called her Erythro and sent a scholar monk called Elisaeus to educate her in Greek language and manners.  However, the alliance fell apart by 786 when she was eleven and Constantine's mother, Irene, broke the engagement in 788.

She had a relationship with Rorgo of Rennes and had one son with him, Louis, Abbot of Saint-Denis (800 – 9 January 867). She never married.

Later life

Rotrude eventually became a nun, joining her aunt Gisela, abbess of Chelles. The two women authored a letter to Alcuin of York, who was at Tours at the time, requesting that he write a commentary explaining the Gospel of John. As a result, Alcuin eventually produced his seven-book Commentaria in Iohannem Evangelistam, a more accessible companion to the gospel than St. Augustine's massive and challenging Tractatus in St. John. Commentators have dated the letter to the spring of 800, four years before Alcuin's death and ten before Rotrude's.

In contemporary views of history, most scholars discriminate between the two phases of Rotrude's life. Political histories of her father Charlemagne discuss her as a princess who was potentially a pawn and a woman of questionable morals, while religious histories discuss her as the second nun in the letter from Chelles.

Ancestry

References

770s births
810 deaths
Frankish princesses
Children of Charlemagne
8th-century Frankish women
9th-century French women
Daughters of emperors
Daughters of kings